Đại Nam Văn Hiến is a tourism complex in Bình Dương Province, Vietnam.

Đại Nam Sea is 21.6 hectare, with a total water surface area of 20,000 sq.m and coast of 1.4 km long. The artificial sea has beaches, with artificial waves up to 1.6m high, it is the largest wave pool in Viet Nam and was designed and manufactured by the famous Scottish Company - Murphys Waves Ltd.

The construction of the largest tourism site started in about 1999, on a  plot of land, some 40 kilometers from Ho Chi Minh City. The Paradise now includes the Đại Nam Văn Hiến Temple, an entertainment site, zoo, shopping area, hotels, and cuisine sites. The 12.5ha open zoo is part of the 450ha Lac Canh Đại Nam Văn Hiến Entertainment Complex. The park is home to rhinos, white lions, tigers, elephants, bears, ostriches, chamois, zebras, gnus, squirrel-monkeys, and foxes, many of which are not typically found in Viet Nam.

Dai Nam Park encompasses a shopping center, hotel, movie theater, theme park, campground, water park, zoo, rides and numerous temples. Its cost for building Dai Nam about VND 3,000 billion. The 12.5 ha open zoo is part of 450ha Lac Canh Van Hien.

Tourist attractions 
Đại Nam Văn Hiến includes a  temple – a replica of the main temple in Hue – with a lotus-shaped flag tower and 13.5-kilometer wall. Outside of the complex lies Bao Son, which at 63 meters tall and 250 meters in length is the biggest man-made mountain in Vietnam. The five peaks and the Bao Thap Tower are a scaled-down version of Ngu Hanh Son Mountain in Da Nang on the central coast. Inside Bao Thap Tower is nine theme-based altars, one on each level, to venerate the country's founders and important figures of Vietnam's history like Ho Chi Minh, Tran Hung Dao and the Trưng Sisters Hai Ba Trung, who lived from 12 to 43 AD.

An assortment of rides such as the roller coaster on square rails, electric car racing, water plume ride, and the swing across the waterfall are similar to the offerings at Dam Sen, Suoi Tien, or Nha Trang's Vinpearland, but larger in scale. Đại Nam Văn Hiến also includes a modern 4D cinema and a "Snow World" theme park nearby. The complex also houses Vietnam's first zoo where visitors can get a close-up view of formerly wild animals. The  zoo has 76 species of birds, reptiles, and mammals, including many rare animals such as white peacocks, white tigers, and white hippos.

References

Buildings and structures in Bình Dương province
Amusement parks in Vietnam
2008 establishments in Vietnam
Tourist attractions in Bình Dương province